Usmate Velate is a  (municipality) in the Province of Monza and Brianza in the Italian region Lombardy, located about  northeast of Milan.

Usmate Velate borders the following municipalities: Casatenovo, Lomagna, Camparada, Carnate, Arcore, Vimercate. It is served by Carnate-Usmate railway station.

Usmate Velate was once knows as Osio, reason for which its Milanese dialect name is Oeus.

References

External links